Berenice Sydney (1944–1983), born Berenice Frieze, and professionally known as 'Berenice', was a British artist who produced a substantial body of work from 1964 until her death in 1983. Her oeuvre consists of paintings on canvas and paper, drawings, prints, children's books, costume design, and performance. A memorial exhibition of her work was held at the Royal Academy in 1984 followed by solo shows in Italy, Abu Dhabi, Bahrain, Switzerland, and Britain. Her work continues to be featured in print and watercolour shows held in Burlington House. Her work is in over 100 private and public collections.

Biography
Berenice Sydney was born in Esher, Surrey in 1944 and educated from the age of six at the Lycée Français Charles de Gaulle in London. From her early years, she studied ballet with Marie Rambert and classical guitar with Adele Kramer. As an adult, she balanced a busy work schedule in her studio by training at the Dance Centre in Covent Garden and attending flamenco dance studios in Hampstead and New York City. Berenice was married to the Italian photographer Romano Cagnoni from 1970 until they divorced in February 1983.

In addition to reading the classics and studying mythology, she was fluent in five languages. She was enrolled at the Central School of Art and Design but left formal art education to set up a studio in Chelsea.

She participated in over 40 exhibitions before her death of an asthma attack at the age of 39. She is buried in the eastern section of Highgate Cemetery. Her father, the documentary filmmaker Joseph Sydney Frieze, died a few months later and is buried with her. Lord McAlpine gave the eulogy at her funeral which was also attended by Dr. David Brown then the Assistant Keeper in Modern Collections at the Tate Gallery.

Career
Berenice Sydney was included in ten group exhibitions between 1963 and 1975 and held eleven solo shows, in addition to being invited to represent Britain at the Biennale della Grafica d'Arte in Florence in 1974. The following year she showed her "stained-glass effect" canvases at the McAlpine Gallery of the Ashmolean Museum.

Her first professional exhibition was held at the Drian Galleries in 1968 and included Susanna and the Elders with Charlie the Pigeon, Coffee Pot and 3 Yellow Flowers and The Drummer Boy.

She began to exhibit her works on paper including Dancing Nymphs, Hermaphroditus, Pan and Two Nymphs, The Marriage of Psyche and Eros, Naiads Surprised by Satyrs, in 1968. Linocuts were also exhibited that year and included Aphrodite and Ares, Nymphs Dancing, Psyche and Eros, Nude Fiddling with Toe, Pan and Two Nymphs and Hebe and Artemis. She continued to explore themes relating to Persian mythology, Christian symbolism and Greek mythological subjects as well as referencing Ancient Egyptian art, creating a hieroglyph of her professional name and working on papyrus.

Responding to the exhibition Salute to Berenice Sydney held at the Royal Academy Max Wykes-Joyce wrote: In the Spring of 1968 I was much charmed by a first one-person show at the Drian Galleries of large, lively paintings which evidenced the artist's interest in dance and music, and a group of black and white drawings on mythological  made in her late teens and very early twenties by the young self-taught Berenice Sydney. I praised them greatly:  show of her work were in turn singled out for admiration in Arts Review by Marina Vaizey, Pat Gilmour, Oswell Baakeston and Charles Bone. And these praises were more recently joined by those of Kenneth Garlick of the Ashmolean Museum and David Brown of the Tate Gallery.

Her painting evolved from figuration to an apparent abstraction which was, in truth, a dance of colours, an expression of natural exuberance. She was continually researching new means of printmaking and mixed media works, each kind of which is represented in this, her memorial exhibition.

Painting
Sydney's work developed from representational to semi-abstract, and she soon established her style in purest abstract form starting with tiny delicate Persian Garden designs, miniatures in naturalistic colours that become abstract etchings: Bakhtiari, The Sultan's Garden, Shirvan Kabistan II, Hachly Moons, Little Squares, Saruk, which were exhibited in 1969.

From 1973 her oils on canvas also began to develop into conceptual abstractions. From discernible figures worked in flowing brush strokes her forms became multi-faceted describing movement in hundreds of colour mutations and shapes. Sydney's later paintings were developed in series, based on specific organic forms, such as leaves (see illustration), that provided a dynamic structural frame for the buildup of paint across large canvasses. Colour combined with vortex-like compositions, starting from a central point to expand outwards, enabled the artist to explore the kinesthetic qualities of visual experience in a way that relates to Bridget Riley's later work.

Printmaking
Sydney continued to experiment in oils and other media and produced etching, engravings in steel (Art in Steel exhibition 1972), copper and perspex monoprints. One of her influences was Stanley William Hayter and her etchings would then use multiple colours on a single plate. She also produced aquatints and lithographs using one plate for each colour process. Her work in serigraphy was also extensive and first exhibited in 1974.

Drawing
Sydney's drawing consistently used acrylic and oil pastels, ink and brush creating a series of works on Gemini paper. She produced a series of intensely detailed pen drawings merging the calligraphic with the figurative in a humorous way, as in Pen drawing with Jester, 1976.

Children's books
Sydney wrote and illustrated a Book of Nonsense Verse 1982/3 later titled Book of Fools which she dedicated to the First of April. A page from this work featuring the poem The Ant who Danced and Pranced is featured in the catalogue to the exhibition Homage to Berenice Sydney. In it the art historian, Florian Rodari's appraisal of Sydney's work appears in French with a translation in English by Charlotte Frieze. The black and white illustrations to the Book of Fools are aquatints etched in a delicately delineated style. The text is written in French and English. Four artist's proofs of the book subsequently titled Book of Fools were printed. The French version of A Book of Fools was purchased by the Bibliothèque Nationale Paris in October 1982 in addition to a number of the artist's earliest etchings, now kept in the Cabinet des Estampes. An audio cassette recording of the artist giving a reading of the Book of Fools was made at the Musée d'Elysée in Lausanne as the artist performed with castanets, accompanied by Gypsy Flamenco musicians and rendered in parts with a Yorkshire accent in homage to her father's family origins.

Exhibitions
Exhibitions during her lifetime 1968–1982

1968
Drian Galleries, First One Person Show, London
Leicester Galleries, - Group Show, London
Edinburgh Festival Costume Designs for Workshops Production of Clown - Televised, Grampian Productions
Magdelene Street Gallery. Group Show, Cambridge
1969 Traverse Theatre Gallery, Group Show, Edinburgh
Lumley Cazalet Gallery, Group Show, London
Camden Arts Centre Group Show, London
Tib Lane Gallery, Group Show, Manchester
Royal Institute Galleries, Group Show F.I.B.A., London WI
1971
International Student House, One Person Show, London
Leicester Galleries. Group Show, London WI
Richard Demarco Gallery, Group Show, Edinburgh
Tib Lane Gallery, Group Show, Manchester
1972
Galleria Stellaria One Person Show, Florence
Zella 9 Gallery, Group Show, London
Art in Steel Exhibition, Group Show, Millbank, London
F.B.A. Galleries, Group Show, London SWI
Magdelene Gallery, Group Show, Cambridge
1973
Christopher Drake Gallery, Group Show, London
Kenwood House Museum, Two Person Show, London, mounted by the Greater London Council
Bear Lane Gallery, One Person Show, Oxford
Van Dyke Gallery. One Person Show, Bristol University
Bibliothèque Nationale de France, Group Show, Paris
Artists from Five Continents" Group Show, Swiss Cottage Central Library
1974
Education Gallery, One Person Show, Leeds City Art Gallery
Willis Museum and Art Gallery. One Person Show, Basingstoke
Biennale della Grafica d'Arte, Florence, Italy representing Great Britain
Haworth Art Gallery, Accrington, One Person Show
1975
McAlpine Gallery, One Person Show, Ashmolean Museum, Oxford
County Museum, One Person Show, Warwick
Museum and Art Gallery. Three Person Show, Leicester
Galleria d'Arte, One Person Show, Milan
St Catherine's College, Oxford One Person Show, Oxford
Trinity College, Oxford. One Person Show
Leicester Museum & Art Gallery. Prints
1976
Biennale Européan de la gravure, Group Show, Mulhouse
Galeria Peters, Group Show, Buenos Aires
Gallery of Modern Art, Two Person Show, Buenos Aires
Cardiff University, One Person Show, Cardiff
Leeds Art Gallery, Series of 6 lectures and demonstrations of etching techniques
1982
The Society of Graphic Artists
Hampstead Artists Council
Free Painters and Sculptors
Chelsea Art Society

Posthumous exhibitions 1984 onward

1984
Salute to Berenice Royal Academy. One Person Show, London
Exhibition of British Art, Abu Dhabi Group Show
Exhibition of British Art, Gulf of Bahrain, Group Show
British Council Paris, Group Show
Centenary Exhibition, Leicestershire Museum and Art Gallery, Group Show
1985
Homage à Berenice Sydney, Edwin Engelberts Galerie d'Art Contemporain, One Person Show, Geneva
1986
Christmas Exhibition' Lumley Cazalet Fine Art, Group Show, London
1987
Berenice Sydney, Gallery of British Contemporary Art, One Person Show, Lausanne
1988
 Berenice Sydney, La Galerie Michel Foex, Geneva, Watercolour painting, One Person Show
1989
 Women in Art, Bowmoore Gallery, Group Show, London
1990
Contemporary British Artists, Waterman Fine Art, Group Show, London
1991
The London Original Print Fair, Royal Academy of Art, London
Represented by Lumley Cazalet
From Fautrier to Rainer, La Galerie Michel Foex, Group Show, Geneva,
including Henri Michaux, Brice Marden, Ben Nicholson, Jean Fautrier
1992
 Homage to the British Artist Berenice Sydney, Galerie Nelly L'Epattenier, One Person Show, Lausanne
1993
 Homage à Berenice, L'Exemplaire, Geneva, One Person Show
 The London Original Print Fair, The Royal Academy of Art, Represented by Peter Black
1994
 Berenice Sydney, L'Exemplaire, Geneva, One Person Show
1995
 Art'95 Contemporary British Art Fair, London
 Milan, Book Print Fair Group
 The Chelsea Art Society Group Exhibition
 A private exhibition of rare and original European prints 18th-20th century at Austin Desmonds, Campbell Fine Art
 Magnat Gallery, London
1996
L'Exemplaire, Geneva, One person show
1998
Girls, Girls, Girls, Deborah Bates Gallery, London
2002
Group show, La Galerie Michel Foex, Geneva, including Ben Nicholson, Rachel Whiteread
2006
Watercolours and Drawings Fair, James Kinmont Fine Art and John Iddon Fine Art, Royal Academy, London
Chelsea Art Fair, John Iddon Fine Art, Royal Hospital, Chelsea, London
Exhibition 9 paintings from the Orbit series, Modern British Artists, London
2008
Watercolours and Drawings Fair, Modern Works on Paper, James Kinmont Fine Art, Royal Academy, London
Chelsea Art Fair, John Iddon Fine Art, Chelsea Old Town Hall, London
2010
 20/21 British Art Fair, John Iddon Fine Art, Royal College of Art, London

Public collections

Museums and galleries
The British Museum, London
The Victoria and Albert Museum, London
The Tate Gallery, London
The British Council, London
The Ashmolean Museum, Oxford
The Bibliothèque nationale de France, Paris
Museum Boijmans Van Beuningen, Rotterdam
The Royal Library of Belgium Brussels
The Uffizi Gallery, Florence
Galleria M. Arte Moderna, Bologna
The Phillips Collection, Washington
The National Library of Congress, Washington
The Smithsonian Institution, Washington
Philadelphia Museum of Art
Fogg Art Museum, Harvard University
Menil Collection, Houston, Texas
Smith College Museum of Art, Northampton, USA
Brooklyn Museum of Art, New York
Capital Nacional de la Nautica, Buenos Aires
Graphische Sammlung der ETH, Zürich, Switzerland
New York Public Library New York, USA
Jenisch Collection, Musée Cantonale, Vevey, Switzerland
Victoria Art Gallery, Bath
City Art Gallery, Bradford
Museum and Art Gallery, Bolton
Cecil Higgins Art Gallery and Bedford Museum
County Museum, Derby
Towner Art Gallery, Eastbourne
City Art Gallerv, Glasgow
Laing Art Gallery, Newcastle upon Tyne
Leicester City Gallery
Graves Art Gallery, Sheffield
Walker Art Gallery, Liverpool
City Museum & Art Gallery, Newport
Reading College & School of Arts and Design now Thames Valley University
Luton Museum & Art Gallery, Luton
South London Gallery
Museum of Reading
Newnham City Collection
City Art Gallery, Wakefield
Humberside Education Services
Humberside Leisure Services
Batley Library
Rochdale Libraries Art Services
Museum & Art Gallery, Rochdale
Durham County Council
Norwich Castle Museum
Nonsuch High School
Cecil Higgins Gallery, Bedford
Museum and Art Gallery, Oldham
Usher Gallery, Lincoln
Portsmouth City Art Gallery

Public and university collections
University of Sussex
University of Manchester
Cardiff University
University of Bristol
University of Bath
University of Glasgow
University of Cardiff
University of Lancaster
University of Sheffield
University of Salford
Bristol Education Authority
Leeds Education Department
Reading Education Department
Derbyshire County Council
Inner London Education Department (ILEA)
Royal Brompton and Harefield NHS Trust
St Thomas' Hospital, London
St Mary's Hospital, London
Bingley & Havering County Council
London Borough of Bromley
Education Office, Preston
Lancashire County Council
Nottingham Education Committee

Corporate and commercial collections
James Walter Thompson London
First National Bank of Boston
Chase Manhattan Bank
Stellaria Galleria, Florence
Pallas Gallery
Lumley Cazalet Gallery
Bear Lane Gallery, Oxford
Drian Galleries, London
Butler Miller
Wilkin Warburton
World Graphics
Hilton Hotels

Private collections
John Jacobs, Curator of Historic Museums and Director of the Iveagh Bequest Kenwood House London
Galeria Peters, Buenos Aires, Argentina
Private Collections, San Francisco, California, USA
Private Collection, Washington D.C., USA
Private Collection, Los Angeles, California, USA
Private Collection, New York City, USA
Private Collection, Geneva, Switzerland
Patrick Cramer, Geneva, Switzerland
Michel Foex, Geneva, Switzerland
Darius Dabatabay, Geneva, Switzerland
Lady Noel Annesly, England
Christopher Johnston Collection, England
Mr. and Mrs. Hariton Embiricos, Greece
Sueo Mitsuma, Tokyo
Lord Alistair McAlpine, England
Linda Talbot, England
4 Private Collections, Sydney, Australia

References

1944 births
1983 deaths
20th-century British printmakers
20th-century English painters
20th-century English women artists
Alumni of the Central School of Art and Design
British abstract artists
Burials at Highgate Cemetery
English etchers
English women painters
People from Esher
Women etchers